Christopher Michael Taylor, professionally known as Sohn (stylised as SOHN), is an English singer, songwriter and record producer. Following the release of the 2012 EP The Wheel by Aesop, he was signed by 4AD. He released his first album, Tremors, on 7 April 2014 followed by Rennen in January 2017 and Trust in November 2022.

Career
Taylor was born in South London and developed an early interest in music. After four albums, he dissolved his successful project Trouble Over Tokyo and reinvented himself as Sohn. In August 2010, he released the first two songs, "Warnings" and "Oscillate", under the Sohn name through his Soundcloud page. A month later, his first EP was announced by the London-based Aesop label. The songs "The Wheel" and "Red Lines" were also streamed online, picking up critical acclaim. The EP The Wheel was released on 5 November 2012 in both digital and vinyl formats. Taylor had been living in Vienna, Austria since 2007.

On 19 April 2013, 4AD announced that it had signed Sohn. This coincided with his first official release through 4AD, "Bloodflows", which Pitchfork described as "a vocal showcase and SOHN's most sorrowful, powerful success yet". and GorillaVsBear mentioned as "simple but mesmerizing and extremely effective video". The single peaked at number one in the Amazing Radio chart on 12 May.

On 11 September 2013, the follow-up track, "Lessons", was published online. Released on limited 12" vinyl on 25 November 2013, the accompanying video was directed by Olivier Groulx and premiered by Dazed & Confused magazine.

Sohn's first album, Tremors, was released in the week of 7 April 2014, with the lead single being "Artifice".

In 2015, Taylor moved to Los Angeles where he worked as a producer for Aquilo, Banks and Kwabs, before moving to Sonoma where he began work on his second album.

In 2015, Taylor released the song "Carry Me Home" as part of the Insurgent soundtrack. The song is played over the ending credits.

In August 2016, the single "Signal" was made available through streaming platforms. It was supported by a video featuring the actress Milla Jovovich. Sohn released a lyric music video of his second single titled "Conrad" on 8 November 2016. The album Rennen was released on 13 January 2017. The tour in support features a live drummer and the vocalist Nylo.

June 2020 saw the release of Sohn's live album, Live with the Metropole Orkest, recorded as a one-off performance in Amsterdam in 2019 with the 54-person-strong Metropole Orkest and conductor Hans Ek.

On 11 May 2022, the single "Figureskating, Neusiedlersee" was released. Sohn issued a second single, titled "Segre", on 13 July 2022. His third studio album, Trust, was released digitally on 2 September 2022 and physically on 4 November 2022.

Personal life
Taylor is married with three children.

Discography

Studio albums

Live albums

EPs

Singles
 "Bloodflows" (2013)
 "Lessons" (2013)
 "Artifice" (2014)
 "The Chase" (2014)
 "Signal" (2016)
 "Conrad" (2016)
 "Rennen" (2016)
 "Hard Liquor" (2017)
 "Hue/Nil" (2018)
 "Unfold" (2018) 
 "Figureskating, Neusiedlersee" (2022)
 "Segre" (2022)

Writing and production credits

Remixes

References

External links
 
 Sohn on 4AD

21st-century English singers
4AD artists
English electronic musicians
English expatriates in Austria
English male singer-songwriters
Living people
Musicians from Vienna
People from London
Remixers
Singers from London
Year of birth missing (living people)
21st-century British male singers